FRK may refer to:

 Federation of Russian Canadians
 Finnish Red Cross
 Frankish language
 Frégate Island Airport, in the Seychelles
 Fructokinase
 Funmilayo Ransome-Kuti
 Fyn-related kinase
 Martin Frk (born 1993), Czech ice hockey player